Chang Hsin-yan is a Taiwanese actress.

Filmography

Film

References

External links

 
 

1982 births
21st-century Taiwanese actresses
Actresses from Taipei
Living people